Bachtiar Karim (born November 5, 1957) or Lim Ek Tjioe is a Chinese-Indonesian tycoon and businessman who lives in Singapore. He is the executive chairman of Musim Mas, one of the world's leading palm oil conglomerates that is family-owned, currently headquartered in Singapore. Despite being listed as Indonesia's #10 richest man, with a net-worth of 3.5 billion US dollar as of 2021, he is publicity-shy and has kept a relatively low profile. Karim was listed in Tatler as one of Asia's Most Influential in 2021

Education
He studied in Singapore at the Hwa Chong Junior College and completed a degree in Mechanical Engineering at the National University of Singapore.

Notable Transactions
In 2019, Karim bought over the entire Darby Park Executive Suites (a 6-story serviced residence building in Singapore) in prime area Orange Grove near Orchard Road for $160 million from Royal Group Holdings Pte Ltd, one of the largest private property transactions in Singapore that year. His family's real estate investment company, Invictus Developments, is redeveloping the plot of land under the Standard Hotels chain into a luxury boutique 143-room hotel, slated to be open in 2023.

In 2022, Karim's family bought the House of Tan Yeok Nee (a mansion building designated as a national monument of Singapore) in the Museum Planning Area through a competitive Expression of Interest exercise (EOI). It is one of just five privately-owned Commercial national monuments. Chayadi Karim, the spokesperson of the Karim family, said they are "exploring various investment strategies for ... this conservation marvel." Currently, it remains the campus of Amity Global Institute.

Family
His father Anwar Karim founded the Nam Cheong Soap Factory in Medan in 1932. He has three brothers: Burhan Karim, Bahari Karim, Bachrum Karim. His family founded an entrepreneur center, which operates in the University of North Sumatra.

Philanthropy 
Karim is actively involved in philanthropy, having his own entrepreneur and training center in Medan, and having donated back to his alma mater, the NUS Business School.

References

Indonesian businesspeople
Indonesian people of Chinese descent
Living people
People from Medan
1957 births
Hwa Chong Junior College alumni
National University of Singapore alumni